The 1960–61 Liga Alef season saw Hapoel Tiberias win the title and promotion to Liga Leumit.

Final table

References
Final tables Maariv, 21.9.61, Historical Jewish Press 
Previous seasons The Israel Football Association 

Liga Alef seasons
Israel
2